Vinton School was built as a fourteen-room elementary school in 1908 at 2120 Deer Park Boulevard in the Deer Park neighborhood of Omaha, Nebraska, United States. Designed by Omaha architect Frederick W. Clarke, Vinton School is the earliest and most elaborate example of a Tudor Revival-style school in Omaha. Designated an Omaha Landmark in June 1990, the building was listed on the National Register of Historic Places in November 1989.

About
Designed in the Tudor Revival style, the Vinton School was built as a two-story brick structure on a rectangular floor plan. Using a technical system of load-bearing walls to support floors of wood joist construction, the building includes a series of hipped roofs.

Rehabilitated into an apartment building in 1990, the building maintains the original exterior features.

The building's architect, Frederick W. Clarke, was also responsible for designing six other schools in the Omaha Public Schools district, including Tech High.

See also
 Vinton Street Commercial Historic District
 History of Omaha

References

National Register of Historic Places in Omaha, Nebraska
History of Omaha, Nebraska
School buildings completed in 1908
Defunct schools in Omaha, Nebraska
Apartment buildings in Omaha, Nebraska
Landmarks in South Omaha, Nebraska
School buildings on the National Register of Historic Places in Nebraska
1908 establishments in Nebraska